Why Sailors Go Wrong is a 1928 American silent comedy film directed by Henry Lehrman and written by Randall Faye and Delos Sutherland. The film stars Sammy Cohen, Ted McNamara, Sally Phipps, Nick Stuart, E. H. Calvert, and Carl Miller. The film was released on March 25, 1928, by Fox Film Corporation.

Cast
Sammy Cohen as Sammy Beezeroff
Ted McNamara as Angus McAxle
Sally Phipps as Betty Green
Nick Stuart as Jimmy Collier
E. H. Calvert as Cyrus Green
Carl Miller as John Dunning
Jules Cowles as Native (uncredited)
Noble Johnson as Native (uncredited)
Jack Pennick as First Mate (uncredited)
Russ Powell as Native Chieftain (uncredited)

Production
The film was originally made by Frank O'Connor at a cost of $110,000. It was completed, but this was scrapped. The film was remade by director Henry Lehrman at a cost of $46,000.

References

External links

1928 films
1920s English-language films
20th Century Fox films
Silent American comedy films
1928 comedy films
Films directed by Henry Lehrman
American black-and-white films
American silent feature films
1920s American films